Coronado Historic Site is the Tiwa pueblo of Kuaua and a historic site that is part of the State-governed Museum of New Mexico system.  It is located along U.S. Federal Route 550, 1 mile west of Bernalillo and 16 miles north of Albuquerque.

History
The Coronado Historic Site is most noted for Kuaua Pueblo (Tiwa for "Evergeen"). The pueblo or village was settled about 1325 and abandoned toward the end of the 16th century.  The Coronado Historic Site was the first state archaeological site to open to the public.  It was dedicated on May 29, 1940, as part of the Cuarto Centenario commemoration (400th Anniversary) of Francisco Vásquez de Coronado's entry into New Mexico. James F. Zimmerman was its first president. Although it is named for Vasquez de Coronado, who camped in the vicinity in 1540–1542, the site is of Kuaua Pueblo which was one of several Tiwa-speaking pueblos in the area when the conquistador Vasquez de Coronado arrived, and the village was almost certainly abandoned due to Coronado and the after effects of the Tiguex War (February 1541).

The ruins of Kuaua Pueblo were excavated from 1934 to 1939 by an archaeological team led by Edgar Lee Hewett and Marjorie F. Tichy (later Lambert).  The excavation revealed a south-to-north development over the village's three centuries of existence, as well as six kivas built in round, square and rectangular shapes.  The site is particularly noted for a series of pre-contact (pre-1541) murals that were recovered from a square kiva in the pueblo's south plaza.  These murals represent one of the finest examples of pre-contact Native American art to be found anywhere in North America.

Visitor's Center
The Coronado visitor's center was designed by noted Southwest architect John Gaw Meem.  It displays fourteen of the restored kiva murals as well as Pueblo Indian and Spanish Colonial artifacts.  An interpretive trail winds through the ruins and along the west bank of the Rio Grande.

See also

National Register of Historic Places listings in Sandoval County, New Mexico

References

External links

 Coronado Historic Site Blog An informative blog that is updated weekly with events and activities* 
 Coronado Historic Site at New Mexico Historic Sites* American Southwest, a National Park Service Discover Our Shared Heritage Travel Itinerary

Archaeological sites on the National Register of Historic Places in New Mexico
Ruins in the United States
Museums in Sandoval County, New Mexico
Native American museums in New Mexico
History museums in New Mexico
Protected areas of Sandoval County, New Mexico
National Register of Historic Places in Sandoval County, New Mexico
Tiwa Puebloans